Hans Frei or Hans Frey (1450–1523) was a renaissance luthier specialising in lutes, from Nuremberg, Germany. He worked in Bologna, Italy. His instruments survive at the Kunsthistorisches Museum, Vienna, Austria.

References

Lute makers
German luthiers
1450 births
1523 deaths